Grampound is a village in Cornwall, England.

Grampound with Creed (where the 2011 census population is included) is the civil parish of which the village of Grampound and the village of Creed are the main settlements.  Formerly, part of Grampound was in the parish of Creed and part was in the parish of Probus.

The name Grampound comes from the Norman French: grand (great), pont (bridge), referring to the bridge over the River Fal, with its spelling varying over the last 600 years following the name Ponsmur (Cornish) which was recorded in 1308. The population of Grampound with Creed was 654 in the 2011 census.

History
The area around Grampound was settled in prehistoric times, and in the early medieval period the parish of Creed and the manor of Tybesta were established here. Grampound grew after the Norman conquest as the main crossing place on the Fal, a focus for travellers and traders moving between west Cornwall and England. Thus Grampound became one of the most important towns in medieval Cornwall with a rich and vibrant history. The bridge from which the town took its name is first recorded in 1296. The first charter was granted by the Earl of Cornwall in 1332 and the town remained important until the 15th century. Thereafter it declined and John Norden refers to the inhabitants as "few and poore" in his account published in 1584.

It was formerly considered a town and the Grampound constituency elected two members to the Unreformed House of Commons from the reign of Edward VI until it was disfranchised in 1821, after a corruption scandal that led to the conviction and imprisonment of several men for bribery. MPs who represented the town include William Noye, John Hampden, Grey Cooper and Charles Wolfran Cornwall.

The seal of the borough of Grampound was "A bridge of two arches over a river, the dexter end in perspective showing the passage over at the sinister and a tree issuing from the base against the bridge on the centre an escutcheon of the arms of the family of Cornwall viz. Arg. a lion rampant Gu. within a bordure Sa."

Grampound also gives its name to Grampound Road which is 3 kilometres (2 mi) to the north west.

Government
Grampound is a ward, along with Creed, of Grampound with Creed Parish which is part of Cornwall Council unitary authority. The current county councillor is Bob Egerton (Independent). Before the formation of the unitary authority in 2009, Grampound was part of Restormel Borough Council.

Grampound is in the St Austell and Newquay constituency and the Member for Parliament is Steve Double (Conservative). Notably in the past Grampound was a 'rotten borough' returning two members of parliament of its own until 1821.

Geography
Grampound lies in the valley of the River Fal north of Tregony. It is on the A390 road 10 kilometres (6 mi) west of St Austell and 13 kilometres (8 mi) east of Truro.

Grampound's linear layout is of Norman origin, with long thin burgage plots extending away from the main street, Fore Street (A390). Most of the village core is a Conservation Area, and there are many listed buildings on Fore Street, for example the local school and the Town Hall. There is a range of buildings of different ages.

Demography
The population of Grampound is a little less than that of Grampound with Creed which was 654 in the 2011 census.

Transport
The A390 runs through the centre of Grampound, in summer when the A30 is congested, the A390 is an alternative route. It is an issue for residents. Pavements in some parts of the village are narrow or non-existent. Traffic speed is an issue through the village. A bypass was considered in 1996, when a route north of the village was favoured, but the plans were rejected, partly due to local protests and partly because Grampound is not large enough to warrant a bypass.

A regular bus service runs to Truro,  to the west, and St Austell,  to the east.

Economy
There are a number of local businesses including Grampound Village Store, Tremethick Brewery, Tristan Hay Pine and Period furniture, Gould Cider and Perry and The Dolphin Inn.

Many people commute to work in the nearby centres of St Austell and Truro. There are a number of businesses run from home.

The tannery industry was important in the past in Grampound. The principal leather tannery, which closed in 2002, was owned by the Croggon family. It consists of several large buildings and surrounding fields on the southern side of the village. This area is being developed into 55 new homes and office space.

Culture and community
There is an annual carnival on the first Saturday in September which includes a procession along Fore Street (A390) which is closed temporarily. Markets are held in Grampound Hall twice a month on a Saturday. One of these markets is run by Transition Grampound and the other by the village hall committee.

The new village hall was opened in 2004 with National Lottery funding. This hall is also an arts venue and regularly hosts performances of drama, dance, and music. Notable past performances include the Norwegian percussionist Terje Isungset performing ice music in 2012. A local amateur dramatic group, The Grampound Players, has also performed in recent years.

The recreation ground is managed by a charity (Grampound with Creed War Memorial Recreation Ground and Public Hall) in Grampound as a public space. It is host to the carnival each year and also to Grampound Football Club who won support from Sport England's Protecting Playing Fields Olympic legacy for it to be resurfaced.

A small museum, the Grampound with Creed Heritage Centre, is located in the Town Hall and hosts a photograph archive online.

Grampound was named Calor Village of the Year for West England 2007/8. The judges commended the community atmosphere of the area. A plaque celebrating the success is now displayed on the Town Hall.

Landmarks in Grampound include the market cross, St Nun's church, and the Town Hall and clock tower in the centre of the village. A war memorial plaque is on the wall of the town hall. The Dolphin Inn is a little further down the hill. Grampound with Creed Primary School, Grampound Hall, and the recreation ground are near the Fal bridge.

Education
Grampound with Creed Primary School is supported by the Diocese of Truro. It has between 50 and 60 pupils. It is currently undergoing a change to become part of a Multi-Academy Trust. The primary school has recently been extended.

Religious sites

The Church of St Nun is the only remaining religious site in Grampound. There is the nearby, older church of St Crida in Creed and they are both managed by the same parochial church council and part of the churches led by the Rector at Probus, Ladock, Grampound with Creed and St.Erme Parishes.

There were a number of chapels in Grampound which have since been converted into dwellings.

Sport
Grampound is home to Grampound Football Club and Grampound Bowling Club both of whom have facilities at the recreation ground.

Notable people
One of Grampound's most famous residents was John Hampden, a politician representing Grampound in 1621 who later, in 1642, was one of the Five Members whose attempted unconstitutional arrest by King Charles I in the House of Commons of England in 1642 sparked the Civil War. Other parliamentarians include William Noy, noted British jurist and MP for Grampound 1603–1614, Charles Wolfran Cornwall, MP for Grampound 1768–1774, and Grey Cooper, MP for Grampound 1768–1774.

The Scottish sculptor Pilkington Jackson was born here.

See also

 Grampound (UK Parliament constituency) (1553–1821)
 Tybesta

References

External links

 Grampound with Creed Parish Council
 Photo Archive of Grampound Heritage Project

Villages in Cornwall